The Metropolitan Police Service (MPS), formerly and still commonly known as the Metropolitan Police (and informally as the Met Police, the Met, Scotland Yard, or the Yard), is the territorial police force responsible for law enforcement and the prevention of crime in Greater London. In addition, the Metropolitan Police is also responsible for some specialised matters throughout the United Kingdom; these responsibilities include co-ordinating and leading national counter-terrorism measures and the personal safety of specific individuals, such as the Monarch and other members of the Royal Family, members of the Government, and other officials (such as the Leader of the Opposition).

The main geographical area of responsibilities of the Metropolitan Police District consists of the 32 London boroughs, but does not include the City of London proper – that is, the central financial district also known as the "Square Mile" – which is policed by a separate force, the City of London Police. As the force responsible for a police area that is also the capital of the United Kingdom, the Met has significant unique responsibilities and challenges, such as protecting 164 foreign embassies and High Commissions, policing London City and Heathrow Airports, policing and protecting the Palace of Westminster, and dealing with significantly more protests and events than any other force in the country, with 3,500 such events in 2016. 

The force, by officer numbers, is the largest in the United Kingdom by a significant margin, and one of the biggest in the world. Leaving its national responsibilities aside, the Met has the eighth-smallest police area (primary geographic area of responsibility) of the territorial police forces in the United Kingdom.

The force is led by the Commissioner, whose formal title is the Commissioner of Police of the Metropolis. The Commissioner is answerable, responsible and accountable to The King, the Home Office and the Mayor of London, through the Mayor's Office for Policing and Crime. The post of Commissioner was first held jointly by Sir Charles Rowan and Sir Richard Mayne. Sir Mark Rowley is the current Commissioner; he succeeded Acting Commissioner Sir Stephen House in July 2022. 
A number of informal names and abbreviations are applied to the Metropolitan Police Service, the most common being "The Met". The Met is also referred to as Scotland Yard after the location of its original headquarters in a road called Great Scotland Yard in Whitehall. The Met's current headquarters is New Scotland Yard, situated on the Victoria Embankment.

History

The Metropolitan Police Service was founded in 1829 by Robert Peel under the Metropolitan Police Act 1829 and on 29 September of that year, the first constables of the service appeared on the streets of London. Ten years later, Metropolitan Police Act 1839 consolidated policing within London by expanding the Metropolitan Police District and either abolishing or amalgamating the various other law enforcement entities within London into the Metropolitan Police such as the Thames River Police and the Bow Street Runners.

Governance
Since January 2012, the Mayor of London is responsible for the governance of the Metropolitan Police through the Mayor's Office for Policing and Crime (MOPAC). The mayor is able to appoint someone to act on his behalf. , the office-holder is Deputy Mayor for Policing and Crime, Sophie Linden. The work of MOPAC is scrutinised by the Police and Crime Committee (also known as a police and crime panel) of the London Assembly. These structures were created by the Police Reform and Social Responsibility Act 2011 and replaced the Metropolitan Police Authority-appointed board created in 2000 by Greater London Authority Act 1999.

Police area and other forces
The area policed by the Metropolitan Police Service is known as the Metropolitan Police District (MPD). The Met was divided into 32 Borough Operational Command Units that directly aligned with the 32 London boroughs covered. This situation has changed since 2017, as the Met has attempted to save money due to cuts in funding. The MPD is now divided into 12 Basic Command Units (BCUs) made up of two, three or four boroughs. There is criticism of these changes. The City of London (which is not a London borough) is a separate police area and is the responsibility of the separate City of London Police.

The Ministry of Defence Police is responsible for policing of Ministry of Defence property throughout the United Kingdom, including its headquarters in Whitehall and other MoD establishments across the MPD.

The British Transport Police are responsible for policing of the rail network in Great Britain, including London. Within London, they are also responsible for the policing of the London Underground, London Trams, the London Cable Car and the Docklands Light Railway.

The English part of the Royal Parks Constabulary, which patrolled a number of Greater London's major parks, was merged with the Metropolitan Police in 2004, and those parks are now policed by the Royal Parks Operational Command Unit. There is also a small park police force, the Kew Constabulary, responsible for the Royal Botanic Gardens, whose officers have full police powers within the park. A few local authorities maintain their own borough park constabularies, including Wandsworth Parks and Events Police, Kensington and Chelsea Parks Police, Havering Parks Constabulary and the Hampstead Heath Constabulary. All of these enjoy powers of arrest without warrant as constables, however the officers of the latter have full police powers, much like officers of the Metropolitan Police on the Heath. The other parks police primarily focus on by-law enforcement.

Metropolitan Police officers have legal jurisdiction throughout all of England and Wales, including areas that have their own special police forces, such as the Ministry of Defence, as do all police officers of territorial police forces. Officers also have limited powers in Scotland and Northern Ireland. Within the MPD, the Met will take over the investigation of any serious crime from the Ministry of Defence Police and to a lesser degree BTP, if it is deemed appropriate. Terrorist incidents and complex murder enquiries will almost always be investigated by the Met, with the assistance of any relevant specialist force, even if they are committed on Ministry of Defence or railway property.  A minor incursion into the normal jurisdiction of territorial police officers in England and Wales is that Met officers involved in the protection duties of the Royal Family and other VIPs have full police powers in Scotland and Northern Ireland in connection with those duties.

Organisation and structure

The Metropolitan Police Service is organised into the following directorates:

 Frontline Policing
 Met Operations
 Specialist Operations
 Professionalism
 Shared Support Services (part of Met Headquarters)

Each is overseen by an Assistant Commissioner or, in the case of administrative departments, a director of police staff, which is the equivalent civilian staff grade. The management board is made up of the Commissioner, Deputy Commissioner, Assistant Commissioners and Directors.

Ranks

The Metropolitan Police Service uses the standard British police ranks, indicated by epaulettes, up to chief superintendent, but uniquely has five ranks above that level instead of the standard three; namely commander, deputy assistant commissioner, assistant commissioner, deputy commissioner and commissioner. All senior officers of the rank of Commander and above are chief police officers of NPCC (previously ACPO) rank.

The Met approved the use of name badges in October 2003, with new recruits wearing the Velcro badges from September 2004. The badge consists of the wearer's rank, followed by their surname. All officers are assigned a unique identification number which includes a two-letter BCU (Basic Command Unit) code. 

Following controversy over assaults by uniformed officers with concealed shoulder identification numbers during the G20 summit, Commissioner Sir Paul Stephenson said, "the public has a right to be able to identify any uniformed officer whilst performing their duty" by their shoulder identification numbers.

Insignia
The Met uniformed officer rank structure, with epaulette design, is as follows:

The Met also has several active Volunteer Police Cadet units, which maintain their own internal rank structure. The Metropolitan Special Constabulary is a contingent of part-time volunteer police officers and is attached to most Borough Operational Command Units. The Metropolitan Special Constabulary Ranks are as follows:

The prefix "woman" in front of female officers' ranks has been obsolete since 1999. Members of the Criminal Investigation Department (CID) up to and including the rank of chief superintendent prefix their ranks with "detective". Detective ranks are equivalent in rank to their uniform counterparts.  Other departments, such as Special Branch and Child Protection, award non-detectives "branch detective" status, allowing them to use the "Detective" prefix. None of these detective ranks confer on the holder any extra pay or supervisory authority compared to their uniformed colleagues.

Workforce
The following is the current released workforce data for the ranks. The chief officers rank covers all senior ranks as well as special constables covering all special constable ranks.

Arms

Resources

The Metropolitan Police Service is composed of police officers and oolice staff (civilians who are non-warranted). Police officers include full-time, paid officers known as 'regulars', and part-time, voluntary officers from the Metropolitan Special Constabulary. Both regulars and specials enjoy full police powers, wear the same uniform, and carry the same kit. Police Staff include police community support officers (PCSOs), designated detention officers (DDOs), and many other civilian roles. The Met was the first constabulary to introduce PCSOs. Unlike civilian police staff, police officers in the Met (as elsewhere in the UK) are not employees, but rather Crown servants, and holders of the Office of Constable.

Funding for the Metropolitan Police has been cut due to austerity. Changes in the way the government pays for police pensions will lead to further cuts.

Police numbers
 Police officers (regular - of all ranks): 32,373
Police officers (special - of all ranks): 1,840
Police staff (PCSO): 1,254
Police staff (designated detention dfficers): 614
Police staff (other): 9,814
 Police dogs: around 250
 Police horses: 120

Historic numbers of police officers
 1852: 5,625
 1866: 6,839
 1877: 10,336^
 1887: 14,191
 1912: 20,529
 1929: 19,290
 1938: 18,511 
 1944: 17,976*
 1952: 16,400
 1965: 18,016
 1984: 27,000 (approximate)
 2001: 25,000 (approximate)
 2003: 28,000 (approximate)
 2004: 31,000 (approximate)
 2009: 32,543 (excluding 2,622 special constables)
 2010: 33,260 (excluding 3,125 special constables)
 2011: 32,380 (excluding 4,459 special constables)
 2013: 30,398 (excluding 5,303 special constables)
 2014: 30,932 (excluding 4,587 special constables)
 2015: 31,877
 2016: 32,125
 2017: 30,817
 2019: 30,980 (excluding 1,749 special constables)
 2020: 32,766 (excluding 1,874 special constables)
*include temporary constables from war period

^includes 753 officers policing Her Majesty's Dockyards throughout the country

Fleet
The Met operates and maintains a fleet of nearly 5,000 vehicles. In 2018, the fleet covered . The fleet comprises numerous vehicles, including:
 Incident response vehicles (IRV): attached to the various Basic Command Units (BCU) of the Metropolitan Police area, used for frontline policing duties such as patrol and emergency response. Currently using: Vauxhall Astra, BMW 2 Series, Peugeot 308, BMW i3 and Ford Focus. 
 Q-cars: covert unmarked vehicles, belonging to a variety of departments.
 Armed response vehicle (ARV): Transports authorised firearms officers trained to use firearms to deal with incidents involving deadly weapons. Currently using: BMW X5 and Volvo XC90.
 Traffic units: respond to traffic accidents on major roads, enforce traffic laws and encourage road safety. Currently using: BMW 5 Series, BMW X5, Ford Mondeo, and Skoda Octavia.
Motorcycles: utilised by the Roads and Transport Policing Command and Parliamentary and Diplomatic Protection for more agile patrol and response.
Scrambler bikes: used by Operation Venice officers to combat moped gangs.
 Collision investigation units (CIU): respond to and appropriately investigate all major road traffic collisions.
 Protected carriers: used for public order duties.
Personnel carriers: used to transport numerous officers on patrol and to incidents, as well as non-violent public order situations.
 Station vans: used to transport both officers and suspects in a cage in the rear of the van. Currently using: Ford Transit.
 Commercial vehicle units: used to respond to incidents involving commercial vehicles. 
 CBRN units: used to mitigate chemical, biological, radiological and nuclear incidents. These are identified by a large amount of equipment lockers on newer vans and a large array of detecting equipment on the top of older vans.
 Control units: used for incident command and control purposes.
 Armoured multi-role vehicles: used for public order duties, airport and counter-terrorism duties, or as required.
 General purpose vehicles: used for general support and transportation duties of officers or equipment.
 Training vehicles: used to train police drivers.
 Miscellaneous vehicles: such as horseboxes and trailers.

The majority of vehicles have a service life of three to five years; the Met replaces or upgrades between 800 and 1,000 vehicles each year. By 2012 the Met was marking all new marked vehicles with Battenburg markings, a highly-reflective material on the side of the vehicles, chequered blue and yellow for the police, and in other colours for other services. The old livery was an orange stripe through the vehicle, with the force's logo.

The National Police Air Service provides helicopter support to the Met.

A marine policing unit operates 22 vessels from its base in Wapping.

Budget
The force's expenditure for single years, not adjusted for inflation.

Crime figures

Crimes reported within the Metropolitan Police District, selected by quarter centuries.
 1829/30: 20,000
 1848: 15,000
 1873: 20,000
 1898: 18,838
 1923: 15,383
 1948: 126,597
 1973: 355,258
 1998/9: 934,254
 2017/18: 827,225

Detection rates
The following table shows the percentage detection rates for the Metropolitan Police by offence group for 2010/11.

The Metropolitan Police Service "screened out" 34,164 crimes the day they were reported in 2017 and did not investigate them further.  This compares to 13,019 the previous year. 18,093 crimes were closed in 24 hours during the first 5 months of 2018 making it likely that the 2017 total will be exceeded.  Crimes not being investigated include sexual assaults and arson, burglaries, thefts and assaults.  Some critics believe this shows the effect of austerity on the force's ability to carry out its responsibilities.

Specialist units
  Protection Command – This command is split into two branches:  Royalty and Specialist Protection (RASP) and Parliamentary and Diplomatic Protection (PaDP).  RaSP provides personal armed protection for the Royal family, Prime Minister and other ministers, ambassadors and visiting heads of state.  PaDP is responsible for providing armed officers to protect the Palace of Westminster, important residences such as Downing Street and the many embassies found located in London. Royal Palaces are the responsibility of RaSP. The Special Escort Group (SEG) are responsible for escorting the Royal Family, Prime Minister and other ministers, ambassadors and visiting heads of state, and occasionally prisoner transport.
 Aviation Policing Command – Responsible for providing policing (with the majority being armed officers) at Heathrow Airport and London City Airport.
 Flying Squad – A unit which investigates and intercepts armed robberies. The name comes from the fact its members travelled across divisional and borough boundaries.
 Trident Gang Crime Command – Investigates and works to prevent gang crime.
 Roads and Transport Policing Command – Provides policing for the transport network in London, comprising numerous divisions: the Traffic Division, patrols the road, pursuing fleeing suspects and enforcing speed, safety, and drink driving; the Road Crime Team focuses on dangerous drivers, priority roads, uninsured vehicles and 'fatal four' offences; the Safer Transport Team (STT) provide a policing presence on Transport for London's buses and investigates most crimes committed on them. 
 Specialist Firearms Command – (SCO19) Responsible for providing armed response and support across the whole of London with Authorised Firearms Officers (AFO) travelling in ARVs (Armed Response Vehicles) responding to calls involving firearms and weapons. SCO19 has a number of CTSFOs (Counter Terrorist Specialist Firearms Officers), who have additional training. 
 Dog Support Unit – (DSU) Provides highly trained dogs and police handlers. They are trained to detect drugs and firearms, respond to searches, missing people, and fleeing suspects. Bomb-detection dogs are also used for specific duties.
 Marine Policing Unit – (MPU) Provides policing on the waterways of London, responding to situations in the River Thames and tracking and stopping illegal vessels entering and exiting London.
 Mounted Branch – Provides policing on horseback in London. One of their duties is escorting the Royal Guard down The Mall, into and out of Buckingham Palace every morning from April to July, then occasionally through the remainder of the year. They also provide public order support and are commonly called to police football matches in the event of any unrest. All officers are trained in public order tactics on horseback.
 Police Support Unit (PSU)  – Trained to deal with a variety of public order situations outside the remit or capability of regular divisional officers.
Territorial Support Group (TSG) – Highly trained officers, specialised in public order and large scale riots responding around London in marked Public Order Vehicles (POV) with 6 constables and a sergeant in each POV. They aim to: secure the capital against terrorism, respond to any disorder in London, and reduce priority crime through borough support. They respond in highly-protective uniform during riots or large disorder, protecting themselves from any thrown objects or hazards.
Violent Crime Task Force (VCTF) – Formed in April 2018, the VCTF is a pan-London proactive response team to knife and serious violent crime, made up of 300 ring-fenced and dedicated police officers who solely focus on violent crime, weapon-enabled crime and serious criminality.
Operation Venice – Formed in 2017 to deal with record-breaking moped crime in London, but also tackles different types of robbery trends; the Scorpion Team consists of highly skilled drivers and riders who were given a green light to instigate tactical contact against moped and motorbikes involved in criminality.

Stations
In addition to the headquarters at New Scotland Yard, there are many police stations in London. These range from large borough headquarters staffed around the clock every day to smaller stations, which may be open to the public only during normal business hours, or on certain days of the week. In 2017, there were 73 working front counters open to the public in London.

Most police stations can easily be identified from one or more blue lamps located outside the entrance, which were introduced in 1861.

The oldest Metropolitan police station, which opened in Bow Street in 1881, closed in 1992 and the adjoining Bow Street Magistrates' Court heard its last case on 14 July 2006. One of the oldest operational police station in London is in Wapping, which opened in 1908. It is the headquarters of the marine policing unit (formerly known as Thames Division), which is responsible for policing the River Thames. It also houses a mortuary and the River Police Museum.

Paddington Green Police Station, which is no longer operational, received much publicity for its housing of terrorism suspects in an underground complex prior to its closure in 2017.

In 2004, there was a call from the Institute for Public Policy Research for more imaginative planning of police stations to aid in improving relations between police forces and the wider community.

Officers killed in the line of duty

The Police Roll of Honour Trust lists and commemorates all British police officers killed in the line of duty.

Controversies

In 2005, police shot dead Jean Charles de Menezes, a Brazilian man who had wrongly been identified as a perpetrator of the attempted terrorist bombings the day before.

During the 2020 COVID-19 pandemic, the Metropolitan police were found to be 2.17 times as likely to issue fines to black people for lockdown breaches, relative to the general population. 

The Met said: "In total, more white people received FPNs [fixed penalty notices] or were arrested than other individual ethnic groups. However, when compared with the composition of the resident population, higher proportions of those in black and minority ethnic (BAME) groups were issued with FPNs or arrested across London as a whole. The reasons for this are likely to be complex and reflect a range of factors. This includes interactions between the areas subject to significant proactive policing activity targeting crime hotspots and both the variation in the age profile and geographical distribution of ethnic groups in London."

In 2021, the MPS have attracted media coverage for approaches to policing in high-profile cases such as the murder of Sarah Everard, the murders of Nicole Smallman and Bibaa Henry and the handling of internal sexual assault allegations.  Women's rights groups have called for an enquiry into misogyny in the force. 

In March 2021, Wayne Couzens, a serving Metropolitan Police officer with the Parliamentary and Diplomatic Protection unit, was arrested and later charged with the kidnap and murder of Sarah Everard. Couzens was later sentenced to life without the possibility of release. There were renewed calls for high level resignations following public outcry over the Met's response to the Everard case. In March 2022, two serving Met police constables and one ex-officer were charged with sharing offensive messages with Wayne Couzens.

In April 2021 an early-career Metropolitan police officer, Ben Hannam, was found guilty of being a member of a banned terrorist group.

In December 2021, an inquest jury ruled that the deaths in 20142015 of serial killer Stephen Port's final three victims was due in part to the Met Police's failings. The inquest found that the Met "failed to carry out basic checks, send evidence to be forensically examined, and exercise professional curiosity while Port was embarking on his killing spree".

At the beginning of February 2022, the Independent Office for Police Conduct (IOPC) reported on the conduct of officers based in the main at Charing Cross police station. Their investigation found evidence of highly sexualized, violent and discriminatory messages sent as part of WhatsApp group involving 17 officers. The regional director of the IOPC, Sal Naseem, said: "The behaviour we uncovered was disgraceful and fell well below the standards expected of the officers involved. While these officers predominantly worked in teams in Westminster, which have since been disbanded, we know from other recent cases that these issues are not isolated or historic."

In March 2022 it was revealed that a 15-year old black girl, referred to as Child Q, was strip-searched by police in school without an adult present after wrongly being suspected of being in possession of Cannabis. An independent safeguarding report concluded the incident was unjustified and racism was likely a factor. Child Q is now suing the Metropolitan Police and pursuing civil action against her school.  The two police officers who carried out the strip search have been removed from front line duties.  Two years before the Child Q incident there were complaints that many strip searches of children were unjustified.  In 2019 it was found that strip searches were disproportionately done to black and ethnic minority suspects.  Inspectors found the number, “higher than we normally see”, and involved, “many children and a significantly higher proportion of black and minority ethnic detainees”.  Metropolitan Police have strip searched 5,279 children during the three years up to 2022 and 75% (3,939) were from ethnically diverse backgrounds according to the LBC.  Sixteen children strip searched were between ten and twelve years old.  Statistics only cover children strip searched following arrest and the actual figures are likely to be higher. On 24 June 2022, Metropolitan police referred itself to the IOPC for investigation of 8 strip-searches of youngsters under 18.  Reforms will be introduced including that an inspector will have to approve a strip-search of a child, an appropriate adult will have to be present and there will have to be a report.  The Met stated “We have reviewed the policy for ‘further searches’ for those aged under 18 and made changes. This is to assure ourselves the policy is appropriate {...} and that it recognises the fact a child in these circumstances may well be a vulnerable victim of exploitation by others involved in gangs, county lines and drug dealing.” Between 2018 and 2020 there were 650 strip-searches of children, 23% were without an appropriate adult. 58% of boys searched were black.  Rachel de Souza said "I am not reassured that what happened to Child Q was an isolated issue, but instead believe it may be a particularly concerning example of a more systemic problem around child protection within the Metropolitan Police.  I remain unconvinced that the Metropolitan Police is consistently considering children's welfare and wellbeing."  The majority of children strip-searched were innocent.  De Souza said “This low level of successful searches arguably indicates that this intrusive practice may well not be justified or necessary in all cases.”  (95%) of youngsters strip-searched were boys, and a quarter were under 16.  De Souza said “I am also extremely concerned by the ethnic disproportionality shown in these figures, particularly given that ethnicity was determined to be such a key factor in the Child Q case.  I am not reassured that what happened to Child Q was an isolated issue, but instead believe it may be a particularly concerning example of a more systemic problem around child protection within the Metropolitan police. I remain unconvinced that the Metropolitan police is consistently considering children’s welfare and wellbeing.”

In June 2022 the Mayor of London, Sadiq Khan, said that there was evidence of "systemic sexism, racism, homophobia, discrimination, misogyny" in the Met; he accepted that there are "dedicated, decent, brave officers" as well.  Khan said he felt that the new Police Commissioner would need to restore confidence in London police.  Khan accepted that London crime figures are going down.  The Met has been put into special measures by H M Inspectorate of Constabulary. The Home Secretary, Priti Patel, said the Met was not getting "the basics right. (...) The process to recruit a new commissioner is well under way and I have made clear that the successful candidate must demonstrate sustained improvements in the Met Police in order to regain public trust both in London and across the country.  The new commissioner will need to deliver on the public's priorities for the police - making our streets safer, bearing down on crime and bringing more criminals to justice, while continuing to recruit thousands of new officers to protect local communities." The Inspectorate has "systemic concerns" over the Met, including its inadequate response to emergency calls, "barely adequate" recording of crime and child abuse referrals developing a backlog.  A letter from the watchdog to the Met said failures worsened due to the young and inexperienced recruits brought in as an element  of the national move to replace thousands of experienced officers cut as part of austerity measures.  Matt Parr of the Inspectorate wrote to Sir Stephen House that the inspectors had had "substantial and persistent concerns" about the Met "for a considerable time". The concerns included the Met’s approach to tackling corruption which the letter said was "fundamentally flawed" and "not fit for purpose".

In August 2022, the Met started legal proceedings against Parm Sandhu, a former senior officer who has published a book including allegations of 'racial and gender discrimination' against her by the Met. The Met’s claim is that Sandhu has breached a non-disclosure agreement which was part of a settlement agreement between Sandhu and the Met.

In September 2022, there were protests over the death of Chris Kaba, who was shot and killed by a Metropolitan Police officer in south London. The police officer involved was shortly afterwards suspended pending the outcome of the investigation by the IOPC. Two police cars had chased and stopped his vehicle late at night on 5 September, following a suspected armed incident the previous day involving the vehicle Kaba was driving.
The family also privately met with Scotland Yard’s new Commissioner, Sir Mark Rowley, for 25minutes after viewing the footage.

On 17 January 2023, David Carrick, a Met Police Parliamentary and Diplomatic Protection officer, was dismissed from the Metropolitan Police after pleading guilty to 49 offences, including numerous cases of rape. He had been the subject of allegations of  abuse of women over a period of twenty years. The Home Secretary, Suella Braverman, announced that there would be an internal review of the Met’s dismissal processes, and Mark Rowley said that the histories and records of all officers and staff would be rechecked to see whether any previous offending had been missed.

See also

 Bent Coppers, detailing police corruption within the Metropolitan Police Service
 Crimint
 Hendon Police College
 London Emergency Services Liaison Panel
 The Met: Policing London
 Metropolitan police role in phone hacking scandal
 News International phone hacking scandal
 Police Forces of the United Kingdom
 Police National E-Crime Unit
 Project Griffin
 Regal, Olga, and Upstart, three MPS horses decorated for bravery during the Blitz
 Royal National Lifeboat Institution

Other London emergency services:
 London's Air Ambulance Charity
 London Ambulance Service
 London Fire Brigade
 City of London Police

References

External links 

 
 Metropolitan Police at His Majesty's Inspectorate of Constabulary and Fire & Rescue Services
 
Inspector Denning - Victorian Police in Westminster - UK Parliament Living Heritage
Parliamentary Archives, Records of the Metropolitan Police 

 
Police forces of London
Organizations established in 1829
1829 establishments in England
Government agencies established in 1829